Pilocrocis caustichroalis is a moth in the family Crambidae. It was described by George Hampson in 1918. It is found in Peru.

The wingspan is about 30 mm. The forewings are yellowish suffused with brick-red. The antemedial line is red-brown and there is a minute red-brown spot in the upper part of the middle of the cell and discoidal bar. The postmedial line is red-brown. The hindwings are yellowish suffused with brick-red, the costal area white to beyond the middle. There is an oblique red-brown discoidal bar and the postmedial line is red-brown, as well as a faint punctiform brownish terminal line.

References

Pilocrocis
Moths described in 1918
Moths of South America